Oak Point is an unincorporated community in Clark County, Illinois, United States.

References

Unincorporated communities in Clark County, Illinois
Unincorporated communities in Illinois